Elizabeth Anderton (born 28 May 1938 in London) is a retired British ballet dancer and director. After graduating from the Sadler's Wells School, in 1955 she joined the Sadler's Wells Opera Ballet. From 1957 to 1974 she worked at the Royal Ballet, becoming soloist in 1958 and principal in 1961. In 1976 she became involved with London Festival Ballet, first as teacher and guest dancer and later as assistant artistic director (1979–83 and 1984–90). She returned to the Royal Ballet in the 1990s.

Anderton's roles include Cranko's Sweeney Todd (1959), Ashton's The Two Pigeons (1961), Tudor's Knight Errant (1968), and Nureyev's Romeo and Juliet (1977). She also played the Queen in the 1988 TV Movie Natalya Makarova's Swan Lake.

References

1938 births
Dancers of The Royal Ballet
British ballerinas
Living people